Live...Again: Live at Montreux is a live album by American jazz pianist Don Pullen and the African-Brazilian Connection recorded in 1993 at the Montreux Jazz Festival for the Blue Note label.

Reception
The Allmusic review awarded the album 4 stars.

Track listing
 "Yebino Spring" (Yebga Likoba) - 16:35 
 "Ah, George, We Hardly Knew Ya" (Don Pullen) - 18:21 
 "Capoeira" (Guilherme Franco) - 13:17 
 "Kele Mou Bana" (Mor Thiam) - 14:23 
 "Aseeko! (Get up and Dance!)" (Thiam) - 10:33 
Recorded at the Montrex Jazz Festival in Montreux, Switzerland on July 13, 1993

Personnel
Don Pullen - piano
Carlos Ward - alto saxophone
Nilson Matta - bass
J.T. Lewis - drums
Mor Thiam - djembe, tabula, rainsticks, wind chimes, vocals

References

Blue Note Records albums
Don Pullen albums
1993 live albums